Boris Alekseyevich Vasilyev (15 January 1937 – 18 June 2000) was a Russian cyclist. He competed at the 1960 Summer Olympics in the sprint and tandem sprint events and won a bronze medal in the tandem sprint. In 1977, aged 40, he was part of the Soviet team at the Peace Race and finished in second place in the second stage. After retirement he worked as a cycling coach. In particular, he prepared the Soviet track team for the 1980 and 1988 Summer Olympics.

References

1937 births
2000 deaths
Russian male cyclists
Soviet male cyclists
Olympic cyclists of the Soviet Union
Cyclists at the 1960 Summer Olympics
Olympic bronze medalists for the Soviet Union
Olympic medalists in cycling
Cyclists from Moscow
Medalists at the 1960 Summer Olympics